Pervomaisk Raion is located in Mykolaiv Oblast of Ukraine. Its administrative center is the town of Pervomaisk. Population:

History
In the beginning of the 19th century, the current area of the district belonged to Olviopolsky Uyezd of Kherson Governorate. In 1828, Olviopolsky Uyezd was merged with Yelisavetgradsky Uyezd into Bobrinetsky Uyezd. In 1865, the administrative center of Bobrinetsky Uyezd was moved to Yelisavetgrad, and the uyezd was renamed Yelisavetgradsky. In 1919, Olviopol was merged with Bohopil and Holta to form the city of Pervomaisk. On 16 April 1920, Kherson Governorate was renamed Nikolayev Governorate, and on 21 October 1922, it was merged into Odessa Governorate. In 1923, uyezds in Ukrainian Soviet Socialist Republic were abolished, and the governorates were divided into okruhas. Bohopil Raion of Pervomaisk Okruha was established. In 1925, the governorates were abolished, and okruhas were directly subordinated to Ukrainian SSR. In 1927, Bohopil Raion was renamed Pervomaisk Raion. In 1930, okruhas were abolished, and raions were directly subordinated to Ukrainian SSR. On 27 February 1932, Odessa Oblast was established, and Pervomaisk Raion was included into Odessa Oblast. On 17 February 1954, Pervomaisk Raion was transferred to Mykolaiv Oblast.

On 18 July 2020, as part of the administrative reform of Ukraine, the number of raions of Mykolaiv Oblast was reduced to four, and the area of Pervomaisk Raion was significantly expanded. Three abolished raions, Arbuzynka, Kryve Ozero, and Vradiivka Raions, as well as the city of Pervomaisk, which was previously incorporated as a city of oblast significance and did not belong to the raion, were merged into Pervomaisk Raion. The January 2020 estimate of the raion population was

Subdivisions

Current
After the reform in July 2020, the raion consisted of eight hromadas:
 Arbuzynka settlement hromada with the administration in the urban-type settlement of Arbuzynka, transferred from Arbuzynka Raion;
 Blahodatne rural hromada with the administration in the selo of Blahodatne, transferred from Arbuzynka Raion;
 Kamianyi Mist rural hromada with the administration in the settlement of Kamianyi Mist, retained from Pervomaisk Raion;
 Kryve Ozero settlement hromada with the administration in the urban-type settlement of Kryve Ozero, transferred from Kryve Ozero Raion;
 Myhiia rural hromada with the administration in the selo of Myhiia, retained from Pervomaisk Raion;
 Pervomaisk urban hromada with the administration in the city of Pervomaisk, transferred from the city of oblast significance of Pervomaisk; 
 Syniukhyn Brid rural hromada with the administration in the selo of Syniukhyn Brid, retained from Pervomaisk Raion;
 Vradiivka settlement hromada with the administration in the urban-type settlement of Vradiivka, transferred from Vradiivka Raion.

Before 2020

Before the 2020 reform, the raion consisted of three hromadas, 
 Kamianyi Mist rural hromada with the administration in Kamianyi Mist;
 Myhiia rural hromada with the administration in Myhiia;
 Syniukhyn Brid rural hromada with the administration in Syniukhyn Brid.

References

Raions of Mykolaiv Oblast
1923 establishments in Ukraine